The following is a timeline of the history of the city of Campeche, Mexico.

Prior to 20th century

 1540 - San Francisco de Campeche founded by Spaniard Francisco de Montejo.
 1633 - Sack of Campeche (1633) by Dutch privateers.
 1659 - Town "sacked by the British."
 1663 - Sack of Campeche (1663) by pirates.
 1685 - Campeche raided by Dutch pirate Laurens de Graaf.
 1732 - Puerta de la Tierra (gate) erected.
 1760 -  built.
 1762 - San José el Alto fort built.
 1777 - Campeche attains city status;  established.
 1796 - Hospital de San Lazaro founded.
 1801 -  (fort) built.
 1821 - 5 November: Campeche secedes from Yucatán.
 1840 - June: Yucatecan occupation begins.
 1857 - 6–7 August: Coup in Campeche.
 1858 - State of Campeche established.
 1864 - 26 January: French in power.
 1871 - Telegraph begins operating.
 1879 - Population: 15,190.
 1883 - "Naval base established at Lerma."
 1895 - Catholic Diocese of Campeche established.

20th century

 1900 - Population: 17,109.
 1903 - Bank of Campeche established.
 1914 -  becomes Governor of Campeche state.
 1950 - Population: 31,279.
 1958 - Estadio Venustiano Carranza (stadium) built.
 1970 - Population: 69,506.
 1973 - Novedades de Campeche newspaper begins publication.
 1975 - Tribuna de Campeche newspaper begins publication.
 1980 - Piratas de Campeche baseball team formed.
 1981 - Corsarios de Campeche football club formed.
 1989 - Autonomous University of Campeche established.
 1990 - Population: 150,518.
 1994 - El Sur de Campeche newspaper begins publication.
 1999 - Fortified Town of Campeche designated an UNESCO World Heritage Site.

21st century

 2001 - Estadio Nelson Barrera (stadium) opens.
 2005 - Population: 238,850 municipality.
 2007 -  begins broadcasting.
 2009 - Carlos Ernesto Rosado Ruelas elected mayor.
 2010 - Population: 220,389 city of San Francisco de Campeche; 259,005 municipality.
 2011 - Cañoneros de Campeche football club formed.

See also
 
 Campeche history (state)
  (state)
 List of presidents of Campeche Municipality

References

This article incorporates information from the Spanish Wikipedia.

Bibliography

in English
 
 
 
 
 
 
 
  (fulltext via OpenLibrary)
  (fulltext via OpenLibrary)

in Spanish

External links

 
 Items related to Campeche, Mexico, various dates (via Digital Public Library of America)

History of Campeche
Campeche
Campeche City